Eagle County is a county located in the U.S. state of Colorado. As of the 2020 census, the population was 55,731. The county seat is the Town of Eagle and the most populous community is Edwards. The county is named for the Eagle River.

Eagle County comprises the Edwards, CO Micropolitan Statistical Area.

History
Eagle County was created by the Colorado legislature on February 11, 1883, from portions of Summit County. It was named after the Eagle River, which runs through the county. The county seat was originally set in Red Cliff, Colorado, but was moved to the town of Eagle in 1921.

The Ground Hog Mine, near Red Cliff, produced gold and silver in two vertical veins in 1887. One vein, or "chimney", contained gold in crystalline form, cemented by iron, while the other contained wire gold in the form of "ram's horns". One of these ram's horns is now on display in the Harvard Mineralogical Museum.

Geography
 

Much of the county is taken up by White River National Forest, and much of the rest is managed by the Bureau of Land Management. Interstate 70 crosses the county from east to west.

The Eagle River rises in the southeastern part of the county. It receives Gore Creek at Dowds Junction, and joins the Colorado River in the west. Fryingpan River and the Roaring Fork River intersect the southwest corner of the county.

Adjacent counties
Grand County – northeast
Summit County – east
Lake County – south
Pitkin County – southwest
Garfield County – west
Routt County – northwest

Major highways
  Interstate 70

  U.S. Highway 6
  U.S. Highway 24
  State Highway 82
  State Highway 131

National protected areas
White River National Forest
Eagles Nest Wilderness
Flat Tops Wilderness
Holy Cross Wilderness

State protected area
Sylvan Lake State Park

Trails
Colorado Trail
Continental Divide National Scenic Trail
Two Elk National Recreation Trail
Vail Pass National Recreation Trail

Scenic byways
Colorado River Headwaters National Scenic Byway
Top of the Rockies National Scenic Byway

Demographics

As of the census of 2000, there were 41,659 people, 15,148 households, and 9,013 families living in the county. The population density was 25 people per square mile (10/km2). There were 22,111 housing units at an average density of 13 per square mile (5/km2). The racial makeup of the county was 85.4% White, 0.3% Black or African American, 0.7% Native American, 0.8% Asian, 0.1% Pacific Islander, 10.8% from other races, and 1.9% from two or more races. 23.2% of the population were Hispanic or Latino of any race.

There were 15,148 households, out of which 32.7% had children under the age of 18 living with them, 50.0% were married couples living together, 5.6% had a female householder with no husband present, and 40.5% were non-families. 20.9% of all households were made up of individuals, and 1.9% had someone living alone who was 65 years of age or older. The average household size was 2.73 and the average family size was 3.17.

In the county, the population was spread out, with 23.5% under the age of 18, 11.4% from 18 to 24, 42.1% from 25 to 44, 20.0% from 45 to 64, and 3.0% who were 65 years of age or older. The median age was 31 years. For every 100 females there were 121.00 males. For every 100 females age 18 and over, there were 125.80 males.

The median income for a household in the county was $62,682, and the median income for a family was $68,226. Males had a median income of $37,603 versus $30,579 for females. The per capita income for the county was $32,011. About 3.9% of families and 7.8% of the population were below the poverty line, including 6.8% of those under age 18 and 7.6% of those age 65 or over.

Life expectancy

According to a report in JAMA, residents of Eagle County had a life expectancy from birth of 85.94 years in 2014, the third-longest in the United States. Men live 84.4 years on the average and women live 87.6 years. Two contiguous counties, Summit and Pitkin counties, rank numbers one and two in the nation in life expectancy.

Factors contributing to the high life expectancy of the three Colorado counties are "high education, high income, high access to medical care, the people are physically active, obesity is lower than anywhere elseso you’re doing it right.” said Dr. Ali Mokdad, one of the study's co-authors.

Politics

Communities

Towns 
Avon
Basalt
Eagle
Gypsum
Minturn
Red Cliff
Vail

Census-designated places
Dotsero
Edwards
El Jebel
Fulford
McCoy
Wolcott

Other unincorporated places
Bond
Burns
Eagle-Vail
Sweetwater

Ghost towns
Gilman
Holy Cross City

See also

Outline of Colorado
Index of Colorado-related articles
Colorado census statistical areas
Flight of Craig D. Button
National Register of Historic Places listings in Eagle County, Colorado

References

External links
Eagle County Government website
Eagle County Transportation Service, Vail Taxi
Vail Valley Partnership – The Chamber and Tourism Bureau
Colorado County Evolution by Don Stanwyck
History Colorado

 

 
Colorado counties
1883 establishments in Colorado
Populated places established in 1883